Jose Maria Villanueva Acuin, better known as Jojo Acuin (1947, San Pablo City, Laguna – April 29, 2010, Quezon City), was a Filipino psychic. He was dubbed the "Nostradamus of Asia and the Pacific."

Career
Acuin became popular because of his predictions. Some of his predictions included Fidel Valdez Ramos becoming President of the Philippines in 1992, the eruption of Mount Pinatubo in 1991, the Central Luzon earthquake in 1990 and the accidental death of director Lino Brocka in 1991.

In 2004, Acuin also predicted that a presidential candidate will die before the election year itself ends, which turned out to be popular actor and Gloria Macapagal Arroyo's chief rival Fernando Poe Jr.

Acuin also predicted that Judy Ann Santos will become pregnant with her husband Ryan Agoncillo's first biological child, which turned out to be a boy.

Death
Acuin was diagnosed with diabetes mellitus October 2009. He then developed pneumonia and was hospitalized on March 19, 2010. He died from cardiac arrest after several of his internal organs failed at the Philippine Heart Center on April 29, 2010. He was 63 years old.

Filmography

Movies
Takbo...Talon...Tili!!! (1992) (segment "Mahiwagang Banga")
The Vizconde Massacre Story: God Help Us! (1993)
The Untold Story: Vizconde Massacre 2 - God Have Mercy on Us (1994)
Feng Shui (2004)

References 

1947 births
2010 deaths
Filipino psychics
Filipino LGBT people
People from San Pablo, Laguna